Sir Harry Kottingham Newton, 2nd Baronet (2 April 1875 – 22 June 1951) was a British Conservative politician. He was elected member of parliament (MP) for Harwich in 1910, a seat he held until 1922.

Newton was educated at Rugby School and New College, Oxford. He served in the Second Boer War with a City volunteer regiment when his father was Lord Mayor. He was a Lieutenant of the City of London and a director of Harrods.

He died in June 1951, aged 76.

References

Kidd, Charles, Williamson, David (editors). Debrett's Peerage and Baronetage (1990 edition). New York: St Martin's Press, 1990,

External links

1875 births
1951 deaths
Baronets in the Baronetage of the United Kingdom
Conservative Party (UK) MPs for English constituencies
Members of the Parliament of the United Kingdom for Harwich
UK MPs 1910–1918
UK MPs 1918–1922
People educated at Rugby School
Alumni of New College, Oxford
British Army personnel of the Second Boer War